"The Tide Is High" is a 1967 rocksteady song written by John Holt, originally produced by Duke Reid and performed by the Jamaican group the Paragons, with Holt as lead singer. The song gained international attention in 1980, when a cover version by the American band Blondie became a US and UK number one hit. The song topped the UK Singles Chart again in 2002 with a version by the British girl group Atomic Kitten, while Canadian rapper Kardinal Offishall had a minor hit with his interpretation in 2008.

The Paragons version
"The Tide Is High" was written by John Holt and originally recorded by the Paragons (the rocksteady vocal trio of which he was a member), and accompanied by Tommy McCook and the Supersonic Band. It was produced by Duke Reid and released as a 7-inch single on Reid's Treasure Isle and Trojan labels and as the B-side of the single "Only a Smile".

The song features the violin of "White Rum" Raymond, and was popular in Jamaica as well as in the UK when a deejay version by U-Roy was released in 1971. Both tracks from the single were included on the 1970 collection On the Beach.

Track list
"Only a Smile"
"The Tide Is High" – 2:53

Blondie version

"The Tide Is High" was covered by the American new wave band Blondie in 1980, in a reggae style that included horns and strings. It was released as the lead single from the band's fifth studio album, Autoamerican (1980), giving Blondie their third number one single on the US Billboard Hot 100 chart and their fifth in the UK (where it became Blondie's last British number one for 18 years, until "Maria" in February 1999). The track also reached number one in Canada and New Zealand, and was a Top 5 hit on many European charts as well as in countries including Australia and South Africa. The B-side was "Susie and Jeffrey", which appeared as a bonus track on the original 1980 cassette edition of the Autoamerican album, and was also included on EMI-Capitol's re-issue of Autoamerican in 2001.

Billboard said that "The instrumental break is catchy while the track sways to a lyrical beat."  Record World called it a "surprising and pleasing reggae track."

Versions
Official remixes of the Blondie version have been issued twice; first by Coldcut in 1988 on the Blondie/Debbie Harry remix compilation Once More into the Bleach, and the second time in 1995 by Pete Arden and Vinny Vero on the album Remixed Remade Remodeled: The Remix Project (UK edition: Beautiful: The Remix Album).

Blondie re-recorded the song for the 2014 compilation album Greatest Hits Deluxe Redux. The compilation was part of a 2-disc set called Blondie 4(0) Ever, which included their tenth studio album Ghosts of Download, and marked the 40th anniversary of the band's formation.

Accolades

(*) indicates the list is unordered.

Track listings
7"
"The Tide Is High" (7" Edit) – 3:54
"Suzy & Jeffrey" – 4:09

US 7" (Chrysalis Classics Re-Issue)
"The Tide Is High" (7" Edit) – 3:54
"Rapture" – 4:59

US 7" (promo only)
"The Tide Is High" (7" Edit) – 3:54
"The Tide Is High" (7" Edit) – 3:54

US 7" (Collectables Record Corp. COL 6115)
"The Tide Is High"
"Heart of Glass"

Charts and certifications

Weekly charts

Year-end charts

All-time charts

Certifications

Papa Dee version

In 1996, Papa Dee covered the song on his album The Journey. It was released on both CD single and CD maxi formats.

Track listings
CD single
"The Tide Is High (On The Beach - Original Version)" – 3:43
"The Tide Is High (Radio Version 1996)" – 3:40

CD maxi
"The Tide Is High (On The Beach - Original Version)" – 3:43
"The Tide Is High (5 Gramme Remix)" – 5:17
"The Tide Is High (Extended Version)" – 5:51
"Great Money Spender"" – 4:08

Charts

Atomic Kitten version

British girl group Atomic Kitten covered "The Tide Is High" and released it as the second single from their second studio album, Feels So Good (2002), on 26 August 2002. Their version of the song also added a new bridge co-written by Howard Barrett, Tyrone Evans and the song's producers Bill Padley and Jem Godfrey, hence the subtitle "Get the Feeling". The song was regularly played on Radio Disney in the United States from 2002 to 2004 and again in 2021. It was used during the opening credits of The Lizzie McGuire Movie and was also used for a TV commercial featuring Japanese beer company Asahi Breweries. This was the group's third and final UK number one single. This version of "The Tide Is High" was selected by The Daily Telegraph writer David Cheal as one of his "Top five awful cover versions" in 2002, describing it as "a ghastly, sickly confection that has none of the wistfulness or soulfulness of either Blondie's version or the Paragons' original".

The group performed the track for the first time ever with the original line-up for their 2012 reformation on The Big Reunion, with Kerry Katona performing Jenny Frost's vocals.

Chart performance
Atomic Kitten's version of the song proved successful on the charts, selling over 1.5 million copies worldwide. It spent three weeks at number one in the United Kingdom (selling 145,000 copies in the first week; it was eventually certified Platinum and has sold over 600,000 copies), and is the group's third and final UK number one. The track also topped the charts in Ireland and New Zealand, and was a Top 5 hit in many other countries, including Australia, Belgium, Germany, the Netherlands and Turkey amongst others.

Music video
The music video is Atomic Kitten's most famous due to band member Natasha Hamilton being heavily pregnant at the time. The video begins with the group walking in front of a flashing rainbow. Whenever the chorus of the song is heard, a dance accompanies it. Hamilton, Liz McClarnon and Jenny Frost choreographed a simplistic dance that they would also perform during live shows. Four men are seen dancing alongside the women with slightly different moves.

A sign that reads "Atomic" can be seen flashing throughout the video (and on clips on the "behind the scenes" version showing one girl dancing and three girls dancing). Each group member has a different set for their solo. McClarnon is next to a silver tree, with a purple background and a repeating pattern of the same tree that she is dancing beside. Frost is next to a car while Hamilton is seen in a pink-coloured room with "number 1" signs. At the song's bridge, the three women are seen dancing near fluorescent purple lights.

Spanish version
Atomic Kitten also recorded a Spanish version of the single, titled "Ser tu pasión". It was released in Colombia, Mexico and Spain, but failed to chart. However, the song promoted Atomic Kitten's second studio album Feels So Good in Mexico, and as a result, the album peaked at number 69 on the charts there; it was also included on the Spanish version of Atomic Kitten's Greatest Hits album.

Track listings

UK CD1 (blue)
"The Tide Is High (Get the Feeling)" (radio mix) – 3:26
"Album Medley" – 5:10 
"Dancing in the Street" – 3:39
"The Tide Is High (Get the Feeling)" (video) – 3:26

UK CD2 (red)
"The Tide Is High (Get the Feeling)" (radio mix) – 3:26
"The Tide Is High (Get the Feeling)" (Groove Brothers 12-inch remix) – 5:35
"The Tide Is High (Get the Feeling)" (Lasgo Remix) – 5:40

UK cassette single
"The Tide Is High (Get the Feeling)" (radio mix) – 3:26
"Album Medley" – 5:10
"The Tide Is High (Get the Feeling)" (Groove Brothers edit) – 3:20

European CD single
"The Tide Is High (Get the Feeling)" (radio mix) – 3:26
"Album Medley" – 5:10

Australian CD single
"The Tide Is High (Get the Feeling)" (radio mix) – 3:26
"It's OK!" (Almighty Mix) – 6:32
"The Tide Is High (Get the Feeling)" (Groove Brothers edit) – 3:20
"The Tide Is High (Get the Feeling)" (Groove Brothers 12-inch) – 5:34
"Whole Again" (M*A*S*H Master Mix) – 7:15

Credits and personnel
Credits are lifted from the Feels So Good album booklet.

Studios
Recorded and mixed at Wise Buddah Music Studios (London, England)
Mastered at Sony Music Studios (London, England)

Personnel

John Holt – writing
Tyrone Evans – writing
Howard Barrett – writing
Bill Padley – writing, all instruments, programming, production, arrangement
Jem Godfrey – writing, all instruments, programming, production, arrangement
Carrie Grant – additional vocal production
John Davis – mastering
Chris Potter – mastering

Charts

Weekly charts

Year-end charts

Decade-end charts

Certifications

Release history

Kardinal Offishall version

"Numba 1 (Tide Is High)" is a 2008 version of the song, performed by Canadian rapper Kardinal Offishall (featuring Keri Hilson). Produced by Supa Dups, the song – a percussive, dancehall-infused hip hop update – was released in September 2008 as the fourth single from Offishall's fourth album Not 4 Sale. It was released on iTunes on 14 October 2008. In March 2010, the single was certified Gold by the CRIA.

In Canada, a version featured Rihanna was released on 12 October 2008 and peaked at number 38. In Latin America a version featured Nicole Scherzinger was released in November.

Music video
The music video premiered on 24 October 2008 at Yahoo! Music. It was directed by Gil Green, with Akon making a cameo appearance. The song "Nina" is featured at the end of the video.

Track list
Digital download / 12-inch maxi-single
"Numba 1 (Tide Is High)" (featuring Keri Hilson) – 3:40
"Numba 1 (Tide Is High)" (featuring Keri Hilson) [Moto Blanco Club Mix] – 6:55

Canadian CD single
"Numba 1 (Tide Is High)" (featuring Rihanna) – 3:44

Latin America CD single
"Numba 1 (Tide Is High)" (featuring Nicole Scherzinger) – 3:39

Remixes
"Numba 1 (Tide Is High) (Dutty South Remix)" (featuring David Banner, Alfamega, Lindo P, Darryl Riley, and Yummy Bingham)
"Numba 1 (Tide Is High) (Dutty Remix)" (featuring Barrington Levy, Busta Rhymes, Lindo P, Darryl Riley, and Yummy Bingham)

Charts and certifications

Weekly charts

Certifications

See also
List of Billboard Hot 100 number-one singles of 1981
List of Cash Box Top 100 number-one singles of 1981
List of number-one dance singles of 1981 (U.S.)
List of number-one singles of 1981 (Canada)
List of number-one singles from the 1980s (New Zealand)
List of UK Singles Chart number ones of the 1980s
List of number-one singles of 2002 (Ireland)
List of number-one singles from the 2000s (New Zealand)
List of UK Singles Chart number ones of the 2000s

References

External links
Classic Tracks: Blondie's "The Tide Is High" (article on how the remake was created)

1967 songs
1967 debut singles
1978 singles
1980 singles
1981 singles
1996 singles
2002 singles
2008 singles
Atomic Kitten songs
Billboard Hot 100 number-one singles
Billie Piper songs
Blondie (band) songs
Cashbox number-one singles
Chrysalis Records singles
Geffen Records singles
Innocent Records singles
Irish Singles Chart number-one singles
Kardinal Offishall songs
Keri Hilson songs
Music videos directed by Gil Green
Music videos directed by Jake Nava
Nicole Scherzinger songs
Number-one singles in New Zealand
Rihanna songs
RPM Top Singles number-one singles
Song recordings produced by Mike Chapman
Songs written by John Holt (singer)
UK Singles Chart number-one singles
Virgin Records singles
Warner Music Group singles
Number-one singles in Scotland